was a Japanese domain of the Edo period. It was associated with Chikugo Province in modern-day Fukuoka Prefecture on the island of Kyushu.

In the han system, Yanagawa was a political and economic abstraction based on periodic cadastral surveys and projected agricultural yields.  In other words, the domain was defined in terms of kokudaka, not land area. This was different from the feudalism of the West.

List of daimyōs
The hereditary daimyōs were head of the clan and head of the domain.

Tanaka clan, 1600–1620 (tozama; 325,000 koku)

Yoshimasa
Tadamasa

    Tachibana clan, 1620–1871 (tozama; 109,000 koku)

Muneshige
Tadashige
Akitora
Akitaka
Sadayoshi
Sadanori
Akinao
Akihisa
Akikata
Akihiro
Akinobu
Akitomo

See also 
 List of Han
 Abolition of the han system

References

External links
 Yanagawa on "Edo 300 HTML" (19 Oct. 2007)

Domains of Japan